"Man in the Mirror" is a song by the American singer-songwriter Michael Jackson. It was written by Glen Ballard and Siedah Garrett and produced by Jackson and Quincy Jones. It was released on February 6, 1988, as the fourth single from Jackson's seventh solo album, Bad (1987).

"Man in the Mirror" topped the Billboard Hot 100 for two weeks, becoming Jackson's tenth number-one single on the chart, and was certified 3× Platinum by the Recording Industry Association of America (RIAA). It was nominated for Record of the Year at the 31st Grammy Awards.

The song peaked at number 21 in the UK Singles Chart upon release in 1988, but in 2009, following the news of Jackson's death, the song peaked at number 2. Keeping the gospel choir arrangement, the song was remixed for the soundtrack of Jackson's tribute tour Immortal.

Writing and recording
"Man in the Mirror" was written by Glen Ballard and Siedah Garrett. Jackson's producer, Quincy Jones, invited Garrett to his home with a group of other songwriters and asked them to write material for Jackson's next album. Garrett recalled that Jones told the group: "I just want hits, that's all I want."

Garrett took the brief to Ballard, her writing partner, who began playing a keyboard figure; Garrett wrote the lyrics. The two recorded a demo over the course of a week, with Garrett on vocals. Garrett delivered the tape to Jones, who called back a few hours later to tell her it was "really good". At Jackson's request, Garrett and Ballard wrote a longer middle eight and modified the lyrics. Jones enlisted the Andraé Crouch Choir to record gospel vocals.

Critical response
When Ed Hogan reviewed the song, he called it "gentle." Jon Pareles of The New York Times noted that this song has "gospelly lift." Rolling Stone Davitt Sigerson thought that "Man in the Mirror" stands among the half dozen best things Jackson has done: "On 'Man in the Mirror,' a song he did not write, Jackson goes a step further and offers a straightforward homily of personal commitment: 'I'm starting with the man in the mirror/I'm asking him to change his ways/And no message could have been any clearer/If you wanna make the world a better place/Take a look at yourself and then make a change.'"

In 2009, Josh Tyrangiel from Time named "Man in the Mirror" among Jackson's ten-best songs and "one of Jackson’s most powerful vocals and accessible social statements, not to mention the best-ever use of a gospel choir in a pop song." In 2017, ShortList's Dave Fawbert listed the song as containing "one of the greatest key changes in music history".

Music video
One of the videos is a notable departure from Jackson's other videos mainly because Jackson himself does not appear in the video (aside from a brief clip toward the end of the video in which he can be seen donning a red jacket and standing in a large crowd). Instead, it featured a montage of footage of various major news events and famous people.

The "Man in the Mirror" music video was directed, produced and edited by Don Wilson. Don and Jackson developed the idea for the video. Larry Stessel who was video commissioner at Epic Records at the time was the executive producer. It features a montage of clips of starving children in Africa, Adolf Hitler, Hitler's American "relatives", George Lincoln Rockwell's American Nazi Party, the Ku Klux Klan, John F. Kennedy and his body being carted away after his assassination, Robert Kennedy and his assassination, Martin Luther King Jr., the Kent State shootings, Mother Teresa, Mahatma Gandhi, start of the Iran hostage crisis, Muammar Gaddafi, Desmond Tutu, Mikhail Gorbachev, Nelson Mandela, Pieter Botha, Lech Wałęsa, the June Struggle in South Korea, homeless people in the U.S., the rescue of Jessica McClure, kids in graduation, and other historical figures.

PCM Stereo music video version of this song was included on Number Ones, Michael Jackson's Vision, the Target version DVD of Bad 25, and the song's video that released on VHS in 1989.

An alternate live video was used as the opening song in Jackson's film Moonwalker with live audio and footage from several live performances of the song during the Bad World Tour. The first segment of Moonwalker is a live performance of "Man in the Mirror" during his Bad Tour in Europe and America. Clips from Met Center among others can be seen.

Live performances
Jackson performed a live, extended version of the song at the 1988 Grammy Awards, having Garrett, the Winans, and the Andraé Crouch choir perform with him. It was staged by Vincent Paterson. He also performed the song as the ending of the concert during the Bad World Tour's second leg, and regularly as the ending of the Dangerous World Tour. Live versions of the song are available on the DVDs Live at Wembley July 16, 1988 and Live in Bucharest: The Dangerous Tour. The song was rehearsed for the HIStory World Tour, but was cut from the final set list and was replaced with HIStory as the ending song. On July 16, 1996, Jackson also performed "Man in the Mirror" at the Royal Concert Brunei for the last time prior to the United We Stand benefit concert. The last time this song was performed was on October 21, 2001, at the United We Stand concert that was held in Washington D. C. as a tribute to the victims of September 11 attacks.

The instrumental introduction to the song was played at the end of Jackson's memorial service, while his casket was being carried out; followed by the appearance of a spotlight shining on a microphone on an empty stage. After a closing prayer that incorporated themes from the song, the spotlight remained shining on the lone microphone. The song is also featured as the final number in Michael Jackson's This Is It.

Track listing
12" and CD
 "Man in the Mirror" (Single Version) – 5:04
 "Man in the Mirror" (Album Version) – 5:19
 "Man in the Mirror" (Instrumental) – 5:19

7"
 "Man in the Mirror" (Single Version) - 5:04

7" / 12" picture disc
 Man in the Mirror – 4:55
 Man in the Mirror (Instrumental) – 4:55

Chart performance
"Man in the Mirror" was the 4th consecutive number-one single for Jackson's Bad in the United States. The single debuted on the Billboard Hot 100 at number 48 on February 6, 1988, and reached number 1 by its 8th week on the chart, on March 26, 1988, where it remained for 2 weeks.

The song originally peaked at number 21 in the United Kingdom in 1988. However, following Jackson's death on June 25, 2009, "Man in the Mirror" re-entered the UK Singles Chart at number 11, and the following week the song peaked at number 2, held off by Cascada's "Evacuate the Dancefloor". This song had been at top 100 for 15 consecutive weeks in this chart. In Australia the song originally charted at number 39. After Jackson's death, the song re-entered the chart and reached number 8. It was also the top single in iTunes downloads in the US and the UK. It has sold 567,280 copies in the UK as of January 2016.

Personnel
 Written and composed by Siedah Garrett and Glen Ballard
 Produced by Quincy Jones
 Co-Produced by Michael Jackson
 Michael Jackson: lead & background vocals
 Featuring Siedah Garrett, the Winans and the Andraé Crouch Choir
 Ollie E. Brown: Clap and Cymbals
 Dann Huff: Guitar
 Greg Phillinganes: Piano
 Glen Ballard, Randy Kerber: Synthesizers
 Glen Ballard: Drum programming
 Siedah Garrett: Background vocals
 The Winans: Carvin, Marvin, Michael and Ronald Winans
 Andrae Crouch and his Choir: Sandra Crouch, Maxi Anderson, Rose Banks, Geary Faggett, Vonciele Faggett, Andrew Gouche, Linda Green, Pattie Howard, Jean Johnson, Perry Morgan, Alfie Silas, Roberto Noriega
 Rhythm arrangement by Glen Ballard and Quincy Jones
 Synthesizer arrangement by Glen Ballard, Quincy Jones and Jerry Hey
 Vocal arrangement by Andrae Crouch

Charts

Weekly charts

Year-end charts

Certifications

See also
Man in the Mirror: The Michael Jackson Story, a 2004 TV film about Jackson's life. Starring Flex Alexander.

References

External links
 
 Glen Ballard biography

1980s ballads
1988 singles
Billboard Hot 100 number-one singles
Cashbox number-one singles
Michael Jackson songs
Protest songs
Pop ballads
Song recordings produced by Quincy Jones
Song recordings produced by Michael Jackson
Songs about poverty
Songs written by Glen Ballard
Songs written by Siedah Garrett
1987 songs
Gospel songs
Epic Records singles